Caroline Blanco (born 1980) is a Danish film producer best known for her collaboration with May el-Toukhy.

Career
Blanco graduated from the National Film School of Denmark's film producer course in 2008.   She has produced May el-Toukhy's debut film Long Story Short (2015) as well as her second film Queen of Hearts (2019) which won the Nordic Council Film Prize audience award in the  World Cinema Dramatic category at the 2019 Sundance Film Festival.

Personal life
Blanco is married to film director and screenwriter Tobias Lindholm with whom she has three sons. They live in Copenhagen.

Filmography

Film

Television series

References

External links
 Caroline Blanco at IMDb

1980 births
Danish film producers
Danish women film producers
Living people
People from Copenhagen